Brandon A. Oakes (born November 23, 1971) is an Akwesasne actor, artist, and dancer. He is a member of the Akwesasne Mohawk Nation.

Career 
Oakes is known for his role in the film Through Black Spruce, for which he was nominated for Best Actor at the 7th Canadian Screen Awards in 2019. He has also appeared in the films Rhymes for Young Ghouls, The Saver, Blood Quantum, Togo and Akilla's Escape, the television series Arctic Air, Saving Hope, Cardinal, Bad Blood, Diggstown, Anne with an E and Unsettled, as well as the web series Decoys.

Filmography

Film

Television

References

External links

Living people
Canadian male film actors
Canadian male stage actors
Canadian male television actors
Canadian Mohawk people
First Nations male actors
Akwesasne
1971 births